The School of Diplomacy, or the School of Vertical and Horizontal Alliances was a political and diplomatic clique during the Warring States period of Chinese history (476-220 BCE). According to the Book of Han, the school was one of the Nine Schools of Thought.

Background

According to the Han Feizi, a contemporary work on Legalist Philosophy, supporters of "Vertical Alliance" encourage the weak multitude to attack the one strong side whilst the Horizontal Alliance promote the one strong side attacking the weak multitude. They are all fickle and capricious, change sides frequently and are unable to decide who their master is. Both Su Qin of the Vertical Alliance clique and Zhang Yi of the Horizontal Alliance clique issue many plans and schemes that are politically subjective.

The origins of the terms "Vertical" and "Horizontal" are geographic and are based on either a north–south axis (i.e. vertical) or an east–west axis (i.e. horizontal). Thus the six states allied on the north–south axis were known as the "Vertical Alliance" whilst those on the east–west axis aligned with the State of Qin were termed the "Horizontal Alliance".

"Zong" indicates the "He Zong", or Vertical Alliance, the "weak multitude against the one strong side", made up of the six states of Qi, Chu, Yan, Han, Zhao and Wei united against Qin. "Heng" indicates the "Lian Heng", or Horizontal Alliance, the "one strong side to smash the weak multitude", thus illustrating the different diplomatic policies of the two sides.

The School of Diplomacy was one of the nine styles of the ten Schools of Thought of the Warring States period and starts with an objective point of view to reach the required goal. The school's adherents were always an active group on the political stage during the Warring States period. Moreover, they played a decisive role and were described as extremely powerful and capable, constantly struggling to manipulate the situation.

Originated by Guiguzi, the School of Diplomacy's main adherents were Su Qin, Zhang Yi (Su's disciple), Gan Mao, Sima Cuo, Yue Yi, Fan Sui, Cai Ze, Zou Ji, Mao Sui, Li Yiji and Kuai Tong as detailed in the Annals of the Warring States.

The few principal written records of the School of Diplomacy that exist today are the thirteenth chapter of the Book of Gui or Guiguzi, the thirty-third chapter of Annals of the Warring States, not about the School of Diplomacy's followers, but primarily the words and actions of its advisors as well as actual combat case studies, the thirty-first chapter of Su Zi and the tenth chapter of Zhang Zi. The seventh chapter of the "Benjing Yifu" appendix to the Guiguzi describes the mental and moral cultivation methods used by the School of Diplomacy; the "Benjing" covers the ideas behind the basic guiding principles whilst the "Yinfu" consists of very mysterious concealed writings. 

The reader can comprehend these but is unable to discover their essential meaning.  The Guiguzi is a book of theory that is complete in every detail and very subtly written, making its ideas hard to express. More importantly the work requires study and use in order to understand the nuances of its meaning. The Annals of the Warring States is a well-written rhetorical compendium the words and actions of the strategists of the School of Diplomacy who were all resourceful, intelligent, aware of the actual situation and gifted in the use of language.

References 

Chinese philosophy
Zhou dynasty
History of ancient China
Political philosophy
Geopolitics
Schools and traditions in ancient Chinese philosophy
Chinese foreign policy